Brotherly love in the biblical sense is an extension of the natural affection associated with near kin, toward the greater community of fellow believers, that goes beyond the mere duty in  to "love thy neighbour as thyself", and shows itself as "unfeigned love" from a "pure heart", that extends an unconditional hand of friendship that loves when not loved back, that gives without getting, and  ever looks for what is best in others.

Brotherly love 
The following is based on the public domain article Brotherly Love found in the 1906 Jewish Encyclopedia

A Biblical command

Brotherly love is the love for one's fellow-man as a brother. The expression is taken from the Greek word Φιλαδελφία (Philadelphia = "love of brothers"), which trait distinguished the Early Christian communities.  –  and  express the idea of Christian fellowship and fraternity. It was also important in the Essene brotherhoods, who practised brotherly love as a special virtue. Brotherly love is commanded as a universal principle in : "Thou shalt love thy neighbor as thyself," the preceding verse containing the words: "Thou shalt not hate thy brother in thine heart." This commandment of love, with the preceding sentence, "Thou shalt not avenge nor bear any grudge against the children of thy people," may originally have referred, and has by some scholars  been exclusively referred, to the Israelitish neighbor; but in verse 34 of the same chapter it is extended to "the stranger that dwelleth with you . . . and thou shalt love him as thyself." In  it is declared unjust to wrong the servant in his cause: "Did not he that made me in the womb make him? and did not one fashion us in the womb?"

The principle of brotherly love, including all men, is plainly stated in the Book of Wisdom i. 6, vii. 23, xii. 19: "Wisdom is man-loving" (Φιλάνθρωπον); "the righteous must be man-loving." The Testaments of the Patriarchs teach the love of God and love of all men "as [His?] children." Commenting upon the command to love the neighbor (Lev. l.c.) is a discussion recorded between Rabbi Akiva, who declared this verse in Leviticus to contain the great principle of the Law ("Kelal gadol ba-Torah"), and Ben Azzai, who pointed to Gen. v. 1 ("This is the book of the generations of Adam; in the day that God created man, in the likeness of God made he him"), as the verse expressing the leading principle of the Law, obviously because the first verse gives to the term "neighbor" its unmistakable meaning as including all men as being sons of Adam, made in the image of God. Tanhuma, in Gen. R. l.c., explains it thus: "If thou despisest any man, thou despisest God who made man in His image."

The Golden Rule

Hillel also took the Biblical command in this universal spirit when he responded to the heathen who requested him to tell the mitzvoth of the Torah while standing before him on one foot: "What is hateful to you, do not do to your friend. This is all of the Torah; the rest is the explanation -- go and learn". The negative form was the accepted Targum interpretation of Lev. xix. 18, known alike to the author of Tobit iv. 15 and to Philo, in the fragment preserved by Eusebius, Preparatio Evangelica, viii. 7; to the Didache, i. 1; Didascalia or Apostolic Constitutions, i. 1, iii. 15; Clementine Homilies, ii. 6; and other ancient patristic writings. That this so-called golden rule, given also in James ii. 8, was recognized by the Jews in the time of Jesus, may be learned from Mark xii. 28-34; Luke x. 25-28; Matt. vii. 12, xix. 19, xxii. 34-40; Rom. xiii. 9; and Gal. v. 14, where the Pharisaic scribe asks Jesus in the same words that were used by Akiva, "What is the great commandment of the Law?" and the answer given by Jesus declares the first and Great Commandment to be the love of God, and the second the love of "thy neighbor as thyself." To include all men, Hillel used the term beriot when inculcating the teaching of love: "Love the fellow-creatures". Hatred of fellow-creatures (sinat ha-beriyot) is similarly declared by Joshua ben Hananiah to be one of the three things that drive man out of the world.

Hate thy enemy?  

That brotherly love as a universal principle of humanity has been taught by the rabbis of old, is disputed by Christian theologians, who refer to the saying attributed to Jesus in Matt. v. 43: "Ye have heard that it was said, Thou shalt love thy neighbor and hate thine enemy, but I say unto you, Love your enemies," etc. Güdemann thinks that Jesus' words had a special political meaning, and that they refer to a view expressed by the zealots who wanted to exclude dissenters from the command of love by such teaching as is found in Abot: "Thou shalt not say, I love the sages but hate the disciples, or I love the students of the Law but hate the 'am ha-areẓ [ignoramuses]; thou shalt love all, but hate the heretics ["minim"], the apostates, and the informers. So does the command, 'Thou shalt love thy neighbor as thyself,' refer only to those that act as one of thy people; but if they act not accordingly, thou needst not love them." Against this exclusive principle, Jesus asserted the principle of brotherly love as applied by the liberal school of Hillel to all men. Indeed, the Talmud insists, with reference to Lev. xix. 18, that even the criminal at the time of execution should be treated with tender love. As Schechter shows, the expression "Ye have heard . . ." is an inexact translation of the rabbinical formula, which is only a formal logical interrogation introducing the opposite view as the only correct one: "Ye might deduce from this verse that thou shalt love thy neighbor and hate thine enemy, but I say to you the only correct interpretation is, Love all men, even thine enemies." There is a commandment to assist thy enemy in case of emergency in Ex 23,5: If thou see the ass of him that hateth thee lying under his burden, and wouldest forbear to help him, thou shalt surely help with him.

The Good Samaritan 

The story of the good Samaritan, in the Gospel of Luke 10 25–37, related to illustrate the meaning of the word "neighbor," possesses a feature which puzzles the student of rabbinical lore. The kind Samaritan who comes to the rescue of the men that had fallen among the robbers, is contrasted with the unkind priest and Levite; whereas the third class of Jews—i.e., the ordinary Israelites who, as a rule, follow the Kohen and the Levite are omitted; and therefore suspicion is aroused regarding the original form of the story. If "Samaritan" has been substituted by the anti-Judean gospel-writer for the original "Israelite," no reflection was intended by Jesus upon Jewish teaching concerning the meaning of neighbor; and the lesson implied is that he who is in need must be the object of our love.

The term "neighbor" has at all times been thus understood by Jewish teachers. In Tanna debe Eliyahu R. xv. it is said: "Blessed be the Lord who is impartial toward all. He says: 'Thou shalt not defraud thy neighbor. Thy neighbor is like thy brother, and thy brother is like thy neighbor.'" Likewise in xxviii.: "Thou shalt love the Lord thy God"; that is, thou shalt make the name of God beloved to the creatures by a righteous conduct toward Gentiles as well as Jews (compare Sifre, Deut. 32). Aaron b. Abraham ibn Ḥayyim of the sixteenth century, in his commentary to Sifre, l.c.; Ḥayyim Vital, the cabalist, in his "Sha'are Ḳedushah," i. 5; and Moses Ḥagis of the eighteenth century, in his work on the 613 commandments, while commenting on Deut. xxiii. 7, teach alike that the law of love of the neighbor includes the non-Israelite as well as the Israelite. There is nowhere a dissenting opinion expressed by Jewish writers. For modern times, see among others the conservative opinion of Plessner's religious catechism, "Dat Mosheh we-Yehudit," p. 258.

Accordingly, the synod at Leipzig in 1869, and the German-Israelitish Union of Congregations in 1885, stood on old historical ground when declaring (Lazarus, "Ethics of Judaism," i. 234, 302) that "'Love thy neighbor as thyself' is a command of all-embracing love, and is a fundamental principle of the Jewish religion"; and Stade, when charging with imposture the rabbis who made this declaration, is entirely in error (see his "Gesch. des Volkes Israel," l.c.).

Philosophic views 

The seven word expression, "Thou shalt love thy neighbour as thyself", appears seven times in the Bible.()

"Thou shalt love" is from Greek αγαπήσεις from άγαπάω (agapao) -  to love (in a social or moral sense:)

"Agape refers to the paternal love of God for man and of man for God but is extended to include a brotherly love for all humanity. (The Hebrew ahev has a slightly wider semantic range than agape). Agape arguably draws on elements from both eros and philia in that it seeks a perfect kind of love that is at once a fondness, a transcending of the particular, and a passion without the necessity of reciprocity."

See also 

 Great Commandment
 The New Commandment

References 

Christian terminology
New Testament words and phrases
Philosophy of love